Greatful Dead (a.k.a. Gureitofuru Deddo) is a 2013 Japanese released film, directed by Uchida Eiji. The film is a black comedy centered around the main character Nami, who spies on lonely people. The film featured in the London Raindance Film Festival

Plot 

Nami, a 20-year-old Japanese woman (played by Takiuchi Kumi), inherits a small fortune. Largely abandoned by her parents as a child, She spends her time idly spending her money, ordering new appliances and buying clothes. However, getting bored of this, she starts to develop a range of abnormal activities. Nami herself, despite being independently wealthy, is lonely and lives an isolated existence. She starts to develop the habit of observing people, and in voyeuristic fashion, she starts to observe other people in a similarly isolated (and sometimes crazed) state. She calls these people "Solitarians". In particular, she focuses on elderly and vulnerable people and in particular, men.  From her apartment in the city, with powerful binoculars, she observes these men, and sometimes watches them descend into madness and death, even taking selfies with their dead bodies. She delights in their misery, and soon her peeping Tom like behavior. However, one of her observed targets, an old man (Takashi Sasano) instead of descending into madness and death as she expected, is saved by Christian volunteers and has his life turned around. This sends her into a murderous rage, pitting old against the young.

Cast 
 Takiuchi Kumi
 Itsuji Itao
 Aira
 Yoichiro Kawakami
 Kkobbi Kim

References

External links 
 
 The Japan Society Review for Gureitofuru Deddo

2010s Japanese films
2010s Japanese-language films